Glipa cladoda is a species of beetle in the genus Glipa. It was described in 1993.

References

cladoda
Beetles described in 1993